Pascal Bosschaart (born 28 February 1980 in Rotterdam) is a Dutch retired footballer and current assistant manager of SC Cambuur.

Club career

Eredivisie
Bosschaart made his professional league debut for FC Utrecht in the 1997–98 season, playing for the club until the 2003–04 season, when he was bought by Feyenoord. His first game for Feyenoord was a 6–1 victory over De Graafschap. In August 2006, he moved to ADO Den Haag. Bosschaart did not see a great deal of game time under former manager André Wetzel in the 2008–09 season, and therefore joined Helsingborgs IF on trial in February 2009. However, he was eventually not signed by the club.

Sydney FC
On 17 June 2011, he signed a 1-year contract with Australian A-League club Sydney FC. On 28 December the club announced that they had re-signed the veteran defender on a 2-year extension, keeping him at the Harbour City club until the end of 2014. During his first year there, he was voted the club's Most Valuable Player.

On 14 January 2012, during a game between Brisbane Roar and Sydney FC, Bosschaart was embroiled in controversy, when following the game Brisbane's Albanian striker Besart Berisha ran up behind the Dutchman and tugged him on the shoulder before running towards the tunnel, motioning that he wanted to fight Bosschaart. Players from both teams came together at the mouth of the tunnel on the half way line to separate the belligerents, however no actual punches were thrown. It was claimed that during a match a month previously, in which Sydney FC won 2–0 and broke the Roar's 36-game unbeaten streak, Bosschaart may have provoked the Albanian by using racial taunts during the game, however this was heavily denied by Bosschaart. It was also claimed by Bosschaart that Brisbane players Ivan Franjic, Eric Paartalu and Berisha himself refused to shake hands with him before the match kicked off. 
After reviewing the incident post-game, the A-League's Match Review Panel (MRP) refused to punish either player over the incident, however the Football Federation Australia asked for a "please explain" from both clubs. The matter was settled by the FFA enacting a one-game ban on Berisha.

On 30 March 2012, during an elimination final against Wellington Phoenix, Bosschaart tore his Achilles tendon and had to be stretchered off. He made his long awaited return for a home game against traditional foe Melbourne Victory on 10 November 2012, where he scored his first ever senior goal; a volley from the edge of the box to put Sydney ahead 2–0, although they ended up losing 3–2.

On 23 October 2013, Sydney FC and Bosschaart mutually agreed to part ways with the club terminating his contract effective immediately. Bosschaart only managed a handful of appearances during his last year at the club.

Honours
Utrecht
KNVB Cup: 2002–03

References

1980 births
Living people
Footballers from Rotterdam
Association football defenders
Dutch footballers
Netherlands under-21 international footballers
FC Utrecht players
Feyenoord players
ADO Den Haag players
Sydney FC players
IJsselmeervogels players
Eredivisie players
A-League Men players
Derde Divisie players
Dutch expatriate footballers
Expatriate soccer players in Australia
Dutch expatriate sportspeople in Australia